Ivan Bohatyr (born 24 April 1975) is a former Ukrainian footballer and Ukrainian football manager.

In 1994–2002 he played for FC Metalurh Zaporizhzhia.

References

External links
 
 

1975 births
Living people
Footballers from Zaporizhzhia
Ukrainian footballers
Ukrainian Premier League players
Ukraine under-21 international footballers
FC Viktor Zaporizhzhia players
FC Metalurh Zaporizhzhia players
FC Metalurh-2 Zaporizhzhia players
SSSOR Metalurh Zaporizhzhia players
SC Tavriya Simferopol players
FC Metalist Kharkiv players
MFC Mykolaiv players
FC Oleksandriya players
FC Desna Chernihiv players
Ukrainian football managers
FC Metalurh Zaporizhzhia managers
Association football defenders
Association football midfielders